Bavaria-Landshut was a duchy in the Holy Roman Empire from 1353 to 1503.

History

The creation of the duchy was the result of the death of Emperor Louis IV the Bavarian.  In the Treaty of Landsberg 1349, which divided up Louis's empire, his sons Stephen, William, and Albert were to receive jointly Lower Bavaria and the Netherlands. Four years later the inheritance was divided again in the Treaty of Regensburg 1353; Stephen received the new duchy of Bavaria-Landshut. In 1363 Stephen became also Duke of Upper Bavaria which was then re-united with Bavaria-Landshut. After Stephen's death his three sons ruled the duchy jointly. But in 1392 Bavaria-Landshut was divided for the three dukes and so Bavaria-Munich and Bavaria-Ingolstadt were split off.

In 1429 parts of Bavaria-Straubing were united with Bavaria-Landshut, as was the entire duchy of Bavaria-Ingolstadt in 1447. Bavaria-Landshut was then the richest part of Bavaria, also due to the mining in Rattenberg and Kitzbühel and the most modern administration. The seat of the dukes was the Trausnitz Castle in Landshut until 1475, when they moved to  the second residence at Burghausen Castle.

The duchy lasted overall 150 years until the death of Georg the Rich triggered the Landshut War of Succession. At the war's end in 1505, the land was divided between the newly created duchy of Palatinate-Neuburg and Bavaria-Munich. Kufstein and Kitzbühel were ceded to Maximilian I, Holy Roman Emperor as compensation for his support to Bavaria-Munich and then united with Tyrol.

References

External links
1500AD Map of Bavaria-Landshut at http://www.euratlas.net/history/europe/1500/entity_5685.html

States and territories established in 1353
1505 disestablishments
Former states and territories of Bavaria
Landshut (district)
Duchy of Bavaria
Duchies of the Holy Roman Empire